Wallace 'Wally' Sykes (born 1942) is a British former sports shooter.

Sports shooting career
Sykes competed at the 1984 Summer Olympics.

He represented England and won a silver medal in the skeet pair with Jim Sheffield and a bronze medal in the skeet, at the 1982 Commonwealth Games in Brisbane, Queensland, Australia.

References

1942 births
Living people
British male sport shooters
Shooters at the 1982 Commonwealth Games
Commonwealth Games medallists in shooting
Commonwealth Games silver medallists for England
Commonwealth Games bronze medallists for England
Olympic shooters of Great Britain
Shooters at the 1984 Summer Olympics
Medallists at the 1982 Commonwealth Games